Freaky may refer to:

 Freaky (TV series), a New Zealand children's program
 Freaky (film), a 2020 horror-comedy film from Blumhouse Productions
 "Freaky" (Koda Kumi song), 2006
 "Freaky!", a 2020 song by Italian singer Senhit, San Marino's entry for the Eurovision Song Contest 2020
 Freaky (album), a 1996 album by MN8
 Freakies, a breakfast cereal brand
 "Freak Me", a 1992 single by Silk

See also
 Freak (disambiguation)
 
 FreakyLinks, an American television show
 Freaky Styley, a 1985 album by American alternative rock band Red Hot Chili Peppers
 Freaky Eaters (British TV programme), a BBC documentary about people on restricted diets
 Freaky Stories, a Canadian television series
 Freaky Friday (disambiguation)